Ernest Frederick Pym (23 March 1935 – 22 October 2004) was an English professional footballer who played all of his professional career as a left-winger for his local side Torquay United. He joined Torquay in September 1957 from local side St. Marychurch and as one of Eric Webber's most inspired signings went on to score 83 times in 284 league appearances, before leaving for non-league Poole Town in 1965. He is Torquay United's 6th all-time top goal scorer with 187 goals from 305 games playing left-midfield.

He joined non-league Bridgwater Town and playing alongside former Torquay teammate Tommy Northcott helped Bridgwater win the Western League title in 1968. He had 2 children and 6 grandchildren.

References

1935 births
Living people
Sportspeople from Torquay
Association football midfielders
English footballers
Torquay United F.C. players
Bridgwater Town F.C. players
English Football League players
Western Football League players